= Sophie Junghans =

German writer

- Born: December 3, 1845
- Died: December 16, 1907 (aged 62); Hildburghausen, Kingdom of Prussia, German Empire

Sophie Junghans (1845-1907) was a German writer whose works include The American Girl. She was once described as having "an almost manly spirit."
